Freed: Fifty Shades Freed As Told By Christian is the sixth book in the Fifty Shades series by E. L. James and was released on 1 June 2021. It tells the story of Fifty Shades Freed from Christian Grey's perspective like the previous two novels in this series.

References

2021 British novels
Fifty Shades novels
British romance novels
Works based on Twilight (novel series)
Women's erotica and pornography